Derbinae is a subfamily of derbid planthoppers in the family Derbidae.

Genera
These 49 genera belong to the subfamily Derbinae:

 Aethocauda Williams, 1976 c g
 Amania Synave, 1973 c g
 Amysidiella Broomfield, 1985 c g
 Anchimothon Fennah, 1952 c g
 Aquaelicium Distant, 1917 c g
 Basileocephalus Kirkaldy, 1906 c g
 Cedochrea Emeljanov, 1995 c g
 Cedochrusa Emeljanov, 2008 c g
 Cenanges Fennah, 1952 c g
 Cenchrea Westwood, 1840 c g
 Contigucephalus Caldwell, 1944 c g
 Copallinges Szwedo, 2004 c g
 Cyclometopum Muir, 1913 c g
 Dawnaria Distant, 1911 c g
 Dawnarioides Dozier, 1929 c g
 Derbe Fabricius, 1803 c g
 Dysimia Muir, 1924 c g b
 Dysimiella Broomfield, 1985 c g
 Equirria Distant, 1917 c g
 Fescennia Stål, 1886 c
 Fordicidia Distant, 1917 c g
 Goneokara Muir, 1913 c g
 Herpis Stål, 1860 c g
 Ipsemysidia Broomfield, 1985 c g
 Lamenia Stål, 1859 i c g
 Malenia Haupt, 1924 c g
 Muirileguatia Metcalf, 1945 c g
 Mysidaloides Broomfield, 1985 c g
 Mysidia Westwood, 1840 c g
 Neocenchrea Metcalf, 1923 c g b
 Neocyclokara Muir, 1917 c g
 Neodawnaria O'Brien, 1982 c g
 Neolamenia Muir, 1917 c g
 Neomysidia Broomfield, 1985 c g
 Nicerta Walker, 1857 c g
 Omolicna Fennah, 1945 c g b
 Oropuna Fennah, 1952 c g
 Paramysidia Broomfield, 1985 c g b
 Paraphenice Muir, 1924 c g
 Patara Westwood, 1840 c g b
 Perandenina Distant, 1911 c g
 Persis Stål, 1860 c g b
 Phaciocephalus Kirkaldy, 1906 c g
 Phenice Westwood, 1840 c g
 Pseudomysidia Metcalf, 1938 c g
 Symidia Muir, 1918 c g
 Syntames Fowler, 1905 g
 Vekunta Distant, 1906 c g
 Vinata Distant, 1906 c g

Data sources: i = ITIS, c = Catalogue of Life, g = GBIF, b = Bugguide.net

References

Further reading

External links

 

 
Derbidae